Ang Rita Sherpa (27 July 194821 September 2020)  was a Nepali mountaineer who climbed Mount Everest ten times without the use of supplemental oxygen between 1983 and 1996. His sixth climb set the world record for the most successful ascents of Mount Everest, which he re-set on his tenth climb. Although others have since summitted Everest more, he still holds the record for most summits without supplementary oxygen. He was also the first, and to date only, person to climb Mount Everest without supplementary oxygen in winter. He was nicknamed the "Snow Leopard" by his peers.

Early life 
Sherpa was born in 1948 in Thame, Solukhumbu. His family reared yaks. He spent his childhood looking after the yaks and as a porter on trading expeditions across the Himalayas to Tibet. He joined mountaineering as a porter at the age of 15. He did not receive any formal education or mountaineering training.

Career
Sherpa's first successful climb was to Mount Cho Oyu at the age of 20. He went on to successfully summit dozens of mountains including Mount Everest, K2, Cho Oyu, Lhotse, Manaslu, Annapurna and Dhaulagiri, multiple times without supplementary oxygen. He is thought to have successfully summitted eight-thousanders a total of 18 times, almost all of them without oxygen.

Sherpa first climbed Mount Everest in 1983. In just over 13 years, he reached the summit of Everest nine more times without the use of bottled oxygen. Eight of his ten summits were via the Southeast ridge route. His last summit was 12 days after the 1996 Everest disaster. He was distraught by the loss of his friends in the disaster. He fell ill that year. According to his family, King Birendra had sent Crown Prince Dipendra to relay his request that Sherpa retire from mountaineering, in view of his deteriorating health. He stopped mountaineering following the visit by the Crown Prince.

Sherpa was the first person to reach the summit of Everest in winter without supplementary oxygen, a feat he achieved in 1987. He was also the first person to climb Everest 10 times. He was recognised by the Guinness World Records in 2017 as the only person in the world to have climbed Mount Everest ten times without bottled oxygen, a record he still holds in 2020.

Sherpa was considered by his peers to be the strongest and most skilled Sherpa guide of his time. According to Sherpa, he once signed up as a low-altitude porter in an expedition to Dhaulagiri but was made to carry equipment to Dhaulagiri-III camp, a task he successfully completed without shoes and any climbing gear. In April 1985, he successfully took the leader of the Norwegian team that he was guiding, to the summit of Mount Everest despite a blizzard. During his record-setting ascent of Everest in the winter of 1987, he assisted a South Korean team. According to Sherpa, after he and another climber got separated from the team one night, the two performed aerobic exercises all night to keep warm and alive. In 1990, he assisted a team from the Nepali Army in their Everest expedition. From the team that started its preparation with almost 50 members, only four reached the summit along with Sherpa, only one of them a soldier of the Nepali Army.

Illness and death 
Sherpa retired from mountaineering in 1996 after he fell ill due to a liver ailment that lasted the rest of his life. He also had a stroke around 2015–16. 
Sherpa died suddenly at his daughter's residence in Kathmandu, at around 10 A.M. on 21 September 2020, at age 72. Prime Minister KP Sharma Oli expressed his condolences on Twitter—"His accomplishments will be forever remembered."

Sherpa's body was kept in a gompa in Kathmandu before the funeral on 23 September. His funeral was held with national honours at Teku Dobhan, the holy confluence of Bagmati and Bishnumati rivers in Kathmandu, according to Buddhist customs. The minister of tourism and culture, Yogesh Bhattarai, draped his body with the national flag, and a squad from the Nepal Armed Police Force presented a gun salute.

Personal life
Sherpa had three sons and a daughter. His eldest son, Karsang, was also a mountaineer, and had summitted Everest nine times; he died during an expedition in 2012. His second son, Chhewang, has also summitted Everest five times. Ang Rita's wife died a year after the death of their eldest son. Ang Rita lived the last years of his life at his daughter's residence in Jorpati, Kathmandu.

Awards and honours
Sherpa was a recipient of the Order of Gorkha Dakshina Bahu and the Order of Tri Shakti Patta.

Mount Everest ascents

See also
List of 20th-century summiters of Mount Everest
List of Mount Everest summiters by number of times to the summit

References

1948 births
2020 deaths
Nepalese mountain climbers
Sherpa summiters of Mount Everest
Nepalese summiters of Mount Everest
20th-century Nepalese people
People from Solukhumbu District
Guinness World Records
Members of the Order of Gorkha Dakshina Bahu
Members of the Order of Tri Shakti Patta